Microdalyellia is a genus of flatworms belonging to the family Dalyelliidae.

The species of this genus are found in Europe and Northern America.

Species:
 Microdalyellia abursalis (Ruebush, 1937) 
 Microdalyellia arctica (Nasonov, 1923)

References

Platyhelminthes